The 2022–23 season is the 77th season in the history of S.S.C. Napoli and their 15th consecutive season in the top flight. The club are participating in the Serie A, the Coppa Italia, and the UEFA Champions League.

Players

Transfers

In

Out

Pre-season and friendlies

Competitions

Overall record

Serie A

League table

Results summary

Results by round

Matches 
The league fixtures were announced on 24 June 2022.

Coppa Italia

UEFA Champions League

Group stage 

The draw for the group stage was held on 25 August 2022.

Knockout phase

Round of 16
The round of 16 draw was held on 7 November 2022.

Quarter-finals
The quarter-finals draw was held on 17 March 2023.

Statistics

Appearances and goals
Last updated on 19 March 2023

|-
! colspan=14 style="background:#5DAFE3; color:#FFFFFF; text-align:center"| Goalkeepers

|-
! colspan=14 style="background:#5DAFE3; color:#FFFFFF; text-align:center"| Defenders

|-
! colspan=14 style="background:#5DAFE3; color:#FFFFFF; text-align:center"| Midfielders

|-
! colspan=14 style="background:#5DAFE3; color:#FFFFFF; text-align:center"| Forwards

|-
! colspan=14 style="background:#5DAFE3; color:#FFFFFF; text-align:center"| Players transferred out during the season

References

S.S.C. Napoli seasons
Napoli
Napoli